Chimpoo Simpoo is an Indian detective action-comedy Animated television series directed by Amit Gaur and produced by Digitales Studio. It aired on ZeeQ from 2016 to 2017. It is about two friends Chimpoo, who is a young detective, and his pet dog, Simpoo. They have a closet which contains their detective gadgets and tools. They use their instincts and presence of minds to solve mysterious cases and nab the criminal.

Characters

Main
 Chimpoo: Chimpoo is one of the two main characters. He is eight-year-old boy and a young detective. He solves mysteries and find clues about criminals. He usually wears yellow t-shirt and blue jeans. Before adventure, he wears a red detective coat.
 Simpoo: Simpoo is the second main character. He is a white dog. He is a pet of Chimpoo having extraordinary skills. He helps Chimpoo in solving crimes and catching criminals and villains. Before adventure, he also wears a small red detective coat just like Chimpoo.
 Diya: Diya is the daughter of the city commissioner. She is female main lead. She is a pretty girl and dances very well. She is a friend of Chimpoo. She often helps Chimpoo in his adventures.

Recurring
 Commissioner: The anonymous commissioner is the father of Chimpoo's friend Dhiya. He is the commissioner of the city. He has a long mustache and small height.
 Pyarelal: Pyarelal is an inspector. He wants to be promoted. He fears from criminals but before commissioner, he shows himself to be very powerful. He is tall and thin.
 Pandu Hawaldar: Pandu is a police sergeant. Like Pyare, he also fears from criminals and wants promotion in his job. He is fat and loves eating ice-cream. He has a small mustache. He often says De Taali".

Episodes

See also 

 List of Indian animated television series
 Pyaar Mohabbat Happy Lucky
 Bandbudh Aur Budbak

References 

2016 Indian television series debuts
2017 Indian television series endings
Indian children's animated television series
Animated television series about children
Animated television series about dogs